James May's 20th Century is a television series first aired on 10 July 2007 on the British terrestrial channel BBC Two. The series is a co-production by the BBC and the Open University.

The series covers various inventions and discoveries over the past century with some reference to discoveries made before the past century. The show features the eponymous James May, exhibiting and discussing the implications of many of the major advances and inventions made during this period. Each episode features some theme, which was discussed in depth during the show, often following sequential advances in chronological order. The programme is now shown on Eden, Yesterday and Dave. The theme tune is called "The Long Boot", by Jeff Knowler.

Critical reviews
Sam Wollaston writing for Guardian Unlimited described James May's 20th Century as "essentially Top Gear, masquerading as something educational" but conceded that if "teaching history can be achieved through Top Gear, then maybe that's not such a bad thing". The New Statesman thought that James May was "ill-suited to the task in hand" and described the biggest problem as May being unable to "put his wretched motors behind him". The Lancashire Telegraph wrote positively of the show praising the presenter May as "someone with genuine enthusiasm for what they were doing."

Ratings

The 6 episodes were originally aired in 3 double-bills on BBC Two in a Tuesday 8pm to 9pm timeslot. Episodes 1 & 2 both attracted 2.4 million viewers and a 12% share. Episodes 5 & 6 received slightly less with 1.9 million and 2.3 million viewers, and respective shares of 10% and 12%. The programme finished behind BBC One and ITV but ahead of Channel 4 and Five.

Episodes
Original air dates:

 10 July 2007 - Episode 1 - Honey, I Shrunk The World
 10 July 2007 - Episode 2 - Blast Off
 17 July 2007 - Episode 3 - Body Fantastic
 17 July 2007 - Episode 4 - Take Cover!
 24 July 2007 - Episode 5 - Inventing The Teenager
 24 July 2007 - Episode 6 - Big City, Bright Lights

References

External links 
 
 
 James May's 20th Century at BBC/OU

20th Century
2007 British television series debuts
2007 British television series endings
2000s British documentary television series
BBC high definition shows
2000s British television miniseries
Documentary television series about technology
English-language television shows
BBC television documentaries about history during the 20th Century